Wolffia angusta is a species of flowering plant in the family Araceae.

References

Lemnoideae
Plants described in 1980